Antonio Fernández Arias (around 1614 – 1684) was a Spanish painter of the Baroque period.

He was born in Madrid to a Galician father.  He was a precocious pupil of Pedro de las Cuevas, and employed at the age of 11 years to assist in painting the main altar of chapel of Carmen Calzado de Toledo. By 22 years, he was one of the more prized painters in Madrid, employed by the Conde-Duque de Olivares along with Francisco Camilo and Alonso Cano to paint the portraits in the Hall of the Kings of the Royal Palace of Madrid. He never lacked commissions, he painted 11 paintings for the cloister of the convent of Augustines at San Felipe el Real, in which he represented among other topics, the Passion of Christ and the Baptism of Saint Cines. He painted Sts. Peter, Paul, John, and other saints for the order of Agonizantes de la calle de Fuencarral. Arias died poor in the general hospital of Madrid.

Works
 Retablo de los carmelitas calzados, Toledo (1628, lost)
 Carlos V y Felipe II (Charles V and Philip II) (1639, University of Granada)
 La Virgen del Rosario (164.., Madrid, San Pascual)
 Cristo recogiendo sus vestiduras (1645, Convento de las Carboneras, Madrid)
 La moneda del César (1646, Museo del Prado)
 Virgen con el niño Jesús (c. 1655, Museo del Prado)
 San Agustín y Santa Mónica (Saints Augustine and Monica) (1656, Santa Isabel Monastery, Madrid)
 Camino del Calvario (Road to Calvary) (1657, Convento de San Pascual, Madrid), originally executed for the cloister of the Convent of San Felipe el Real in Madrid
 Lavatorio de los pies a los apóstoles (1657, Museo de Pontevedra).
 Virgen con Cristo muerto en los brazos y San Juan (1658, León, Carvajalas Monastery)
 San Antonio Abad (1675, lower part of the Convento de don Juan de Alarcón de Madrid).

References

Antonio Palomino, An account of the lives and works of the most eminent Spanish painters, sculptors and architects, 1724, first English translation, 1739, p. 11
Pérez Sánchez, Alonso E., Pintura Barroca en España'', 1600-1750. Editorial Cátedra, Madrid 

1684 deaths
17th-century Spanish painters
Spanish male painters
Spanish Baroque painters
Year of birth unknown
Year of birth uncertain